Royal Air Force Feltwell or more simply RAF Feltwell is a Royal Air Force station in Norfolk, East Anglia that is used by the United States Air Forces in Europe – Air Forces Africa.  The station is located about 10 miles west of Thetford, and is in the borough of King's Lynn and West Norfolk at approximate Ordnance Survey grid reference . A former Second World War bomber station, the airfield is used as a housing estate for United States Air Force personnel stationed nearby at RAF Mildenhall.

History

Royal Air Force use

The airfield was built during the period of expansion of the RAF in the late 1930s and is similar in layout to many of the other RAF airfields of the period (for example RAF Marham, RAF Watton and RAF West Raynham).  The airfield was home to a number of heavy bomber squadrons of the RAF during the Second World War.  Post war RAF Thor Missiles were stationed here 1958–1963.  After the departure of the Thor missiles in 1963, the RAF's Officer Cadet Training Unit was based on the station, transferring from RAF Jurby, Isle of Man, in September 1963.

United States Air Force use
From 1989 it also hosted the US Air Force's 5th Space Surveillance Squadron (5 SPSS) which was subordinate to the 21st Operations Group (21 OG) and the 21st Space Wing (21 SW), both at Peterson AFB, Colorado. These organisations in turn are subordinate to the 14th Air Force (14 AF) at Vandenberg AFB, California which reports to HQ Air Force Space Command (AFSPC), also at Peterson AFB, CO.

The 5 SPSS was part of the USAF's Passive Space Surveillance Network which tracked the physical location of emitting satellites in orbit. This data along with that from other systems was used to adjust the orbits of various satellites and manned vessels (for instance the Space Shuttle and the International Space Station) to reduce the risk of on-orbit collisions. It was deactivated in 2003 and the activity transferred to Misawa Air Base in Japan.

The base is used as a housing estate for United States Air Force personnel stationed nearby at RAF Mildenhall and RAF Lakenheath with new housing built in 2011. Earlier it was used for USAF unaccompanied airmen in barracks located on base, while also containing the Mathies Airman Leadership School for USAF personnel in the UK, as well as being the home of the Army and Air Force Exchange Service's sole furniture store in the country. It also houses the only Middle School for Lakenheath and Mildenhall, which covers most of the station.

RAF Feltwell was administered by Detachment 4 of the 18th Intelligence Squadron, which was a space control intelligence organization of the United States Air Force, located at Wright-Patterson AFB, Ohio and which has one other geographically separated detachments: Detachment 2, Osan AB, Korea. However, the 18th IS was deactivated during September 2020 and then reactivated as the US Space Force's 73rd Intelligence, Surveillance and Reconnaissance Squadron, which is assigned to Space Delta 7.

Former units
Former units include:

 No. 37 Squadron RAF (1937–1940) – Handley Page Harrow, Vickers Wellington I
 No. 57 Squadron RAF (1940–1942) – Vickers Wellington I
 No. 75 Squadron RAF (1940–1942) – Vickers Wellington I
 No. 77 Squadron RAF (1958–1963) – Thor IRBM and the USAF 672d Technical Training Squadron and 99th Munitions Maintenance Squadron
 No. 192 Squadron RAF (1943) – Handley Page Halifax II & V
 No. 214 Squadron RAF (1937–1939) – Handley Page Harrow, Vickers Wellington I
 No. 464 Squadron RAAF (1942) – Lockheed Ventura I & II
 No. 487 Squadron RNZAF (1942–1943) – Lockheed Ventura I & II
 No. 651 Squadron RAF (1955–1957) – Auster AOP6
 No. 3 Lancaster Finishing School (1943–1945) – Avro Lancaster
 No. 3 Flying Training School RAF
 No. 3 Service Flying Training School RAF
 No. 7 Temporary Depot Station
 No. 20 Heavy Glider Maintenance Section
 No. 76 (Bomber) Wing RAF
 No. 1519 (Beam Approach Training) Flight RAF
 No. 2724 Squadron RAF Regiment
 No. 2736 Squadron RAF Regiment
 No. 2807 Squadron RAF Regiment
 No. 4194 Anti-Aircraft Flight RAF Regiment
 Bomber Command Radar School
 Bomber Command Strategic Missile School
 Bombing Development Unit
 Central Bomber Establishment
 Gee-H Training Flight
 Midland Area Flying Instructors School
 New Zealand Flight
 Northern Area Flying Instructors School
 Radio Training Squadron
 RAF Officer Cadet Training Unit
 School of Instructional Technique

See also

List of Royal Air Force stations
United States Air Forces in Europe
United States Air Force in the United Kingdom

References

Installations of the United States Air Force in the United Kingdom
Feltwell
Royal Air Force stations in Norfolk
Royal Air Force stations of World War II in the United Kingdom
RAF